Alberts Krievs (10 September 1902 – 19 June 1971) was a Latvian wrestler. He competed in the Greco-Roman bantamweight at the 1924 Summer Olympics.

References

External links
 

1902 births
1971 deaths
Olympic wrestlers of Latvia
Wrestlers at the 1924 Summer Olympics
Latvian male sport wrestlers
Place of birth missing